The mottled snake-eyed skink or Oceania snake-eyed skink (Cryptoblepharus poecilopleurus) is a species of lizard in the family Scincidae. It is found throughout Oceania.

References

Cryptoblepharus
Reptiles described in 1836
Taxa named by Arend Friedrich August Wiegmann
Reptiles of Hawaii